Ebsworth may refer to:

Dame Ann Ebsworth (1937–2002), English barrister and judge
Evelyn Ebsworth (1933–2015), British chemist and academic
Joseph Ebsworth (1788–1868), English dramatist and musician
Joseph Woodfall Ebsworth (1824–1908), English clergyman, editor of ballads, poet and artist
Mary Emma Ebsworth (1794–1881), English dramatist